Bharatbhushan Bhalla, better known as Bharat Bhushan (14 June 1920 – 27 January 1992) was an Indian actor in Hindi language films, scriptwriter and producer, who is best remembered for playing Baiju Bawra in the 1952 film of the same name. He was born in Meerut, and brought up in Aligarh, Uttar Pradesh.

Personal life
Bharat Bhushan was born as Bharatbhushan Bhalla on 14 June 1920 in a Vaishya (Baniya) family at Meerut, Uttar Pradesh, India.

His father, Raibahadur Motilal Bhalla, was the government pleader of Meerut. He had one older brother. His mother died when he was two years old. The brothers left for Aligarh to stay with their grandfather after their mother's death. He did his studies and earned a graduate degree from Dharam Samaj College, Aligarh. His elder brother was film producer Rameshchandra Bhalla, who owned the Ideal Studio at Lucknow. After studies, he took to acting against his father's wishes. He first went to Calcutta to join cinema and later established himself in Bombay.

He married into a prominent family in Meerut, Zamindar Raibahadur Budha Prakash's daughter Sarla. They had two daughters, Anuradha ( who had polio-associated complications) and Aparajita. Bhushan's wife Sarla died of labour complications after delivering their second child in the early 1960s, soon after the release of film Barsaat Ki Raat. In 1967, he married actress Ratna, his co-star from Barsaat Ki Raat . Ratna was a prominent actress who played the sister or friend of the heroine in many films. Among her notable TV appearances was the serial Trishna as mother of the four young girls. It was an adaptation of Pride and Prejudice.

In an interview, his daughter Aparajita had said that after the sudden demise of her husband, she turned to acting. Aparajita has done more than 50 films and TV serials. She played the role of Mandodari in Ramanand Sagar's famous serial Ramayan.

Bhushan owned a bungalow in Bandra suburb of Bombay. This was the famous Aashirwad bungalow, which he sold to Rajendra Kumar, who in turn sold it to Rajesh Khanna. This bungalow, was thus home to 3 famous film stars. Bhushan was an avid reader and boasted of a fine collection of books, which he had to sell off like his cars and bungalows in bad times, after he turned co-producer at the instance of his brother. Only a few of his films were successes and unfortunately, the rest flopped. He died after he escaped his financial crisis, on 27 January 1992.

Professional life 
He made his debut with the Kidar Sharma hit Chitralekha (1941). However, he struggled for over a decade to make a mark in Hindi movies till Baiju Bawra (1952), which gave him instant stardom and legendary status along with Mohammad Rafi, Meena Kumari and Naushad Ali. Though a very talented actor and a prominent star of the 1950s and 1960s in Hindi language films, he often took on roles of tragic musicians in the movies. Films in which he starred as lead actor include Basant Bahar. His pairing with Madhubala proved to be very popular as they worked together in successful films like Gateway of India (1957), Phagun (1958) and Barsaat Ki Raat (1960).

"He portrays historical and mythological characters the best in Hindi movies," states contemporary actor-producer Chandrashekar. He wrote scripts and stories for Barsat Ki Raat, Nayi Umar Ki Nayi Fasal, Basant Bahar, Dooj Ka Chand, etc. He was the producer of Dooj Ka Chand. His brother R. Chandra made many films such as Bebus, Minar, and Basant Bahar.
 
He was the recipient of the second Filmfare best actor award for the film Shri Chaitanya Mahaprabhu in 1954. Most of the great songs of major singers of that period such as Rafi, Manna Dey, Talat, and Mukesh were pictured on him. He was the first chocolate-faced good-looking star of Hindi films. He was one of the few actors who had a good sense of music, so most music-based movies were made with him in lead roles in the 1950s and 1960s.

He acted in Hindi language movies until the 1990s. He is still loved and revered by the Indians for the great movies and great songs that he gave in spite of personal tragedies and stiff competition from his contemporaries. He is considered to be one of the greatest stars and legends of Hindi cinema.

Filmography 

 Chitralekha (1941)
 Bhakta Kabir (1942)
 Bhaichara (1943)
 Sawan (1945)
 Suhaag Raat (1948)
 Rangila Rajasthan (1949)
 Udhaar (1949)
 Thes (1949)
 Ankhen (1950)
 Bhai Bahen (1950)
 Janmashtami (1950)
 Kisi Ki Yaad (1950)
 Ram Darshan (1950)
 Hamari Shaan (1951)
 Saagar (1951)
 Baiju Bawra (1952)
 Maa (1952)
 Anand Math (1952)
 Paheli Shaadi (1953)
 Dana Pani (1953)
 Farmaish (1953)
 Ladki (1953)
 Shuk Rambha (1953)
 Shabaab (1954)
 Meenar (1954)
 Pooja (1954)
 Shri Chaitanya Mahaprabhu (1954)
 Kavi (1954)
 Dhoop Chhaon (1954)
 Aurat Teri Yehi Kahani (1954)
 Mirza Ghalib (1954)
 Amanat (1955)
 Basant Bahar (1956)
 Sakshi Gopal (1957)
 Mera Saalam (1957)
 Champakali (1957)
 Gateway of India (1957)
 Rani Rupmati (1957)
 Samrat Chandragupt (1958)
 Phagun (1958)
 Sohni Mahiwal (1958)
 Sawan (1959)
 Kal Hamara Hai (1959)

 Angulimaal (1960) as Ahinsak aka Angulimaal
 Barsaat Ki Raat (1960)
 Ghunghat (1960)
 Chandi ki Dewar (1960)
 Gyara Hazar Ladkian (1962)
 Sangeet Samraat Taansen (1962) 
 Jahan Ara (1964)
 Dooj Ka Chand (1964)
 Naya Kanoon (1965)
 Taqdeer (1967)
 Pyar Ka Mausam (1969)
 Vishwas (1969)
 Gomti Ke Kinare (1972) as Bharat
 Kahani Kismat Ki (1973) as Doctor
 Ranga Khush (1975)
Solah Shukrawar (1977) as Bhola Bhagat
Hira Aur Patthar (1977) as Tulsiram
 Khoon Pasina (1977) as Kaka
Nawab Sahib (1978)
 Unees-Bees (1980)
 Khara Khota  (1981)
 Yaarana (1981)
 Commander (1981)
 Umrao Jaan (1981) as Khan Saheb (Music Master)
 Adi Shankaracharya (1983)
 Nastik (1983) as Temple Priest
Justice Chaudhury (1983)
 Hero (1983) as Ramu father of Jaikishen
 Zakhmi Sher (1984)
 Sharaabi (1984) as Masterji
 Phaansi Ke Baad (1985)
 Mera Saathi (1985)
Mera Dharam (1986)...Baba
 Kala Dhanda Goray Log(1986)...Maharaj
 Ghar Sansar (1986)...Rahim Chacha
Himmat Aur Mehanat (1987)...Customer in Hotel(Special Appearance)
 Ramayan TV Serial (1987) as Goswami Tulsidas
Pyaar Ka Mandir (1988)
Sone Pe Suhaaga (1988)...Kashinath
 Maalamaal (1988) as Shri Mangatram's Manager
 Abhi To Main Jawan Hoon (1989)
 Chandni (1989) as Doctor
 Ilaaka (1989) as Man with suitcase
 Gharana (1989) as Radha's father
 Toofan (1989) as Priest in the Hanuman's temple
 Jaadugar (1989) as Gyaneshswar
 Baap Numbri Beta Dus Numbri (1990) as John
  Majboor (1989 film) as judge
 Sheshnaag (1990)
   Baaghi (1990) as Asha Father
 Pyar Ka Devta (1991) as Doctor
Karz Chukana Hai (1991) as College Principal 
Irada (1991)
 Prem Qaidi (1991) as Suryanath
Swarg Yahan Narak Yahan (1991) as School Principal 
 Humshakal (1992) as The Judge
 Aakhri Chetawani (1993)

Accolades

References

Sources

External links
 
 Bharat Bhushan, the tragic hero

Male actors from Uttar Pradesh
1920 births
1992 deaths
Rajasthani people
Male actors in Hindi cinema
People from Aligarh
People from Meerut
20th-century Indian male actors
Filmfare Awards winners